Sébastien Lareau and Alex O'Brien were the defending champions.  Lareau did not participate this year.  O'Brien partnered Jared Palmer, losing in the semifinals.

Nicklas Kulti and Max Mirnyi won in the final 6–4, 7–5, against Paul Haarhuis and Daniel Nestor.

Seeds
All seeds receive a bye into the second round.

Draw

Finals

Top half

Bottom half

External links
Draw

2000 Paris Masters
2000 ATP Tour